Mungabunda is a rural locality in the Central Highlands Region, Queensland, Australia.

Road infrastructure
The Dawson Highway passes to the north and the Fitzroy Developmental Road to the east.

References 

Central Highlands Region
Localities in Queensland